Julia Berta Díaz Hernández (October 1, 1936 – November 20, 2019), known as Berta Díaz, was a sprinter from Cuba, who also competed in the long jump and the hurdling events during her career. She represented her native country at two consecutive Summer Olympics, starting in 1956. She was born in Havana, Ciudad de la Habana. She was the first woman to represent Cuba at the Olympics.

References

External links
 
 Bertha Díaz's obituary 

1936 births
2019 deaths
Cuban female sprinters
Cuban female long jumpers
Cuban female hurdlers
Olympic athletes of Cuba
Athletes (track and field) at the 1955 Pan American Games
Athletes (track and field) at the 1956 Summer Olympics
Athletes (track and field) at the 1959 Pan American Games
Athletes (track and field) at the 1960 Summer Olympics
Athletes from Havana
Pan American Games gold medalists for Cuba
Pan American Games silver medalists for Cuba
Pan American Games medalists in athletics (track and field)
Central American and Caribbean Games gold medalists for Cuba
Competitors at the 1962 Central American and Caribbean Games
Central American and Caribbean Games medalists in athletics
Medalists at the 1955 Pan American Games
Medalists at the 1959 Pan American Games
20th-century Cuban women
20th-century Cuban people